Thursday the 12th is a four-part British television crime drama series, written by Paula Milne and directed by Charles Beeson. It has been screened internationally and shown in the United Kingdom at the British Film Institute, but has never been shown on British television. It was initially due to premiere on ITV1 in May 2000, but due to its political themes and proximity to that year's local elections, it was delayed due to concerns it would violate laws regarding political neutrality during election periods; efforts to broadcast it in June 2001 were cancelled for similar reasons, due to that year's general election. 

The series focuses on the Bannister family, whose lives are turned upside down when an unidentified body is found in the grounds of their estate. As an investigative TV reporter takes on the case, Marius Bannister (Ciarán Hinds), a wealthy dentist and politician, his wife Nina (Maria Doyle Kennedy), their troubled adopted teenaged son Martin (Jim Sturgess), and Nina's predatory sister Candice Hopper (Elizabeth McGovern) all come under suspicion.

Broadcast
The series was originally set to broadcast as two feature-length episodes, but due to local elections taking place on the day the first episode was due to be broadcast, 4 May 2000, the series was pulled from the schedules at the last minute, on the grounds that it may be in breach of rules on political bias. Although it was later rescheduled for broadcast in the winter of 2000/2001, the series was once again pushed back, and was set to premiere in June 2001, although due to the foot-and-mouth outbreak of 2001, the general election due to take place in May was put back to 7 June, and the series was subsequently pulled from the schedules once more, with no further attempts to re-schedule it. The series was shown as part of a season showcasing Paula Milne's work at the BFI in London on 14 September 2012.

For international broadcast and release on DVD, the series was re-edited into four episodes, each focusing on the story of a single character. In the United States, the series premiered on Bravo on 4 June 2003. The series was also broadcast in Australia on UKTV. The series was released on Region 1 DVD on 25 September 2007.

Cast
 Ciarán Hinds as Marius Bannister
 Maria Doyle Kennedy as Nina Bannister
 Elizabeth McGovern as Candice Hopper
 Jim Sturgess as Martin Bannister
 Gillian Bevan as Marilyn Forbes
 Trevor Byfield as Frank Ely
 Peter Vaughan Edgar Bannister
 Hugh Bonneville as Brin Hopper
 Jon Glover as Julian Glover
 Christopher James as Hugo Schindler
 Robert Murray	as David Skinner
 Morgan Sass as Daisy Bannister
 Ralph Ineson as Collins
 Vincent Franklin as Hewitt
 Ron Cook as Liam Donnelly
 Robin Houston as the Newscaster

References

External links
 

2000s British crime drama television series
2000s British drama television series
2000s British mystery television series
2003 British television series debuts
2003 British television series endings
English-language television shows
British political drama television series
Television series by Warner Bros. Television Studios